Chingiz Rakparov (born 5 July 1995) is a Kazakhstani nordic combined skier who represented Kazakhstan at the 2022 Winter Olympics.

References

External links

Living people
1995 births
Kazakhstani male Nordic combined skiers
Sportspeople from Almaty
Nordic combined skiers at the 2022 Winter Olympics
Olympic Nordic combined skiers of Kazakhstan
21st-century Kazakhstani people